Doamna may refer to the following places in Romania:

 Doamna, a village in Piatra Neamț municipality, Neamț County 
 Doamna (Bistrița), a tributary of the river Bistrița in Neamț County
 Doamna, a tributary of the river Mureș in Harghita County